Railway Stadium is a football stadium in Lahore, Pakistan and is the home of the Pakistan Railways FC. The stadium has a capacity of 5,000. It is also the former home stadium of the Pakistan national football team, however after many decades they moved to the bigger and more advanced Peoples Football Stadium.

Currently the stadium is also home to Pakistan Premier League 2007-08 champions WAPDA F.C. as well as PEL FC.

Tournaments
The stadium hosted 2015 NBP National Challenge Cup, the domestic cup in Pakistani football, which was won by Khan Research Laboratories, as both the host, Pakistan Railwayss and WAPDA were knocked-out in group stages and semi-finals respectively.

Football venues in Pakistan
Lahore